Dalekmania is a 1995 direct-to-video documentary released in the United Kingdom. "Dalekmania" is the name given to the craze or "mania" among children in the United Kingdom in the 1960s for all things associated with writer Terry Nation's creations, the Daleks, who were then regularly appearing in the BBC's television drama series Doctor Who.

Production
Borrowing that name, Dalekmania is also a 1995 documentary film that examines that mid 1960s craze and focuses in particular on the two 1960s Doctor Who films, Dr. Who and the Daleks and Daleks - Invasion Earth 2150 AD which both feature Peter Cushing as Dr. Who and the Daleks.  Interviews cover the making of the films and their fans. The documentary is the main Special Feature on the Dalek movie DVD release - although the introduction sequence is omitted.

The documentary Dalekmania starts from the beginning, at least as far as the Dalek movies are concerned, and runs through their history, at the same time interviewing actors like Roberta Tovey, who played Dr. Who's granddaughter, Susan, in the two films, and Jill Curzon, who played his niece Louise, in the second film. There are also appearances from actors Barrie Ingham and Yvonne Antrobus, who played the leaders of the Thals in the first film.

The actors give interesting personal accounts of the filming of these movies including anecdotes about the tough porters who were brought in from Covent Garden Market to play the male Thals and their shock when they learned that they would have to shave their chests and arms and wear wigs and make-up to get into character.

The documentary also reveals that the men operating the Daleks were supposedly not treated particularly well, as none of the other actors can recall seeing anyone get in or out of a Dalek, or ever actually meeting a Dalek operator. They recall fond memories of working with cast members who have since died, including Peter Cushing and Roy Castle.

Also interviewed in the documentary is script writer and Dalek creator Terry Nation, who shares his thoughts on the differences between Doctor Who on television and the Dalek movies. He also explains the pride he took in his mechanical creations and the lengths he went to over the years to protect their image.

There are also contributions from fans of the films, in the form of Gary Gillat and Marcus Hearn, editors of magazines concerned with Doctor Who. They attempt to explain the huge impact that the Daleks have had on the public imagination over the years.

The Daleks used during filming were made by London-based model maker Julian Vince, who was also interviewed in the documentary. However, his Daleks were not seen in the final edit due to rights restrictions issues with the BBC (i.e. the fact that the Julian Vince-created props were shown moving and were thus actual Dalek characters, rather than empty props). The sole-remaining Dalek prop in the final edit is a static first movie Red Dalek, seen with Michael Wisher as the cinema commissionaire, and this prop was built by Steve Allen and David Brian.

References

External links
 DVD Verdict Review - Dalekmania
 

British documentary films
Daleks
Works about Doctor Who
1960s in the United Kingdom
1995 films
1995 documentary films
Documentary films about television
Documentary films about fandom
Direct-to-video documentary films
1960s fads and trends
1990s English-language films
1990s British films